Zhang Luqi (born 17 October 1994) is a Chinese sprint canoeist.

She won a medal at the 2019 ICF Canoe Sprint World Championships.

References

1994 births
Living people
Chinese female canoeists
ICF Canoe Sprint World Championships medalists in Canadian